Patrick Joseph Hickey  (born May 15, 1953) is a Canadian former professional ice hockey left winger who played 2 seasons in the World Hockey Association with the Toronto Toros and then 10 seasons in the National Hockey League (NHL) for the New York Rangers, Toronto Maple Leafs, Quebec Nordiques and St. Louis Blues between 1973 and 1985. Pat is the brother of Greg Hickey.

Playing career
Born in Brantford, Ontario, Hickey was drafted 30th overall by the New York Rangers in the 1973 NHL Amateur Draft. Nicknamed "Hitch", Hickey was additionally drafted 18th overall in the 1973 WHA Amateur Draft by the Toronto Toros, for whom he played his first two professional seasons in the World Hockey Association (WHA). Joining the Rangers for the 1975–76 NHL season, Hickey went on to play 646 career NHL games, scoring 192 goals and 212 assists for 404 points. A popular player during his time with the Rangers, Hickey played on a line with Swedish stars Anders Hedberg and Ulf Nilsson, in part because of his speed and scoring ability.

Hickey was later part of a high scoring line in Toronto, along with Rick Vaive and Bill Derlago.

Post-hockey career

Hickey began his financial service career as an account executive with the New York City investment banking firm of Drexel Burnham Lambert upon retirement from the National Hockey League in 1985. In 1988, he was appointed general manager of the New Haven Nighthawks, the Los Angeles Kings' American Hockey League (AHL) affiliate, and was subsequently awarded "Executive of the Year" honours in 1992, for his management of an independent franchise and initiation/completion of the AHL expansion plan. For six years, Hickey was active at the ownership level as well as serving the AHL on finance, marketing and NHL liaison & development committees as a league governor.

Hickey has been extensively involved in developing youth outreach programs. He was an early volunteer supporting Dave Wilk who co-founded Ice Hockey in Harlem, an after school program that blends academics and sport. Hickey has played a critical role in developing relationships between the financial services community and the NYR Seeing Kids Achieve, Triumph and Excel (S.K.A.T.E.) Foundation, (now Garden of Dreams Foundation), the Brantwood Foundation, and Ice Hockey in Harlem. Hickey has served on the board of directors of Ice Theatre (of New York) International, Hillfield Strathallan College and is a board member of the New York Rangers Alumni Association, as well as liaison to the NHL Alumni Board of Directors.

Hickey is an investment advisor and registered institutional representative with RBC Dominion Securities and has been based in Hamilton, Ontario for 17 years. Hickey has been a member of the executive council and designated "Miracle Maker" annually with Children's Charities since 1997.

Legacy
In the 2009 book 100 Ranger Greats, the authors ranked Hickey at No. 78 all-time of the 901 New York Rangers who had played during the team's first 82 seasons.

Career statistics

Regular season and playoffs

References

External links

1953 births
Living people
Canadian expatriate ice hockey players in the United States
Canadian ice hockey left wingers
Canadian people of Irish descent
Colorado Rockies (NHL) players
Hamilton Red Wings (OHA) players
Ice hockey people from Ontario
New York Rangers draft picks
New York Rangers players
Quebec Nordiques players
St. Louis Blues players
Salt Lake Golden Eagles (CHL) players
Sportspeople from Brantford
Toronto Maple Leafs players
Toronto Toros draft picks
Toronto Toros players